Korita may refer to several places:

Bosnia and Herzegovina
Korita, Bileća
Korita, Bosansko Grahovo
Korita, Ilijaš
Korita, Tomislavgrad

Croatia
Korita, Požega-Slavonia County, a village near Lipik
Korita, Dubrovnik-Neretva County, a village on Mljet
Korita, Split-Dalmatia County, a village near Otok
Korita, Karlovac County, a village near Rakovica

Montenegro
Korita, Montenegro

Slovenia
Korita, Idrija
Korita na Krasu